A Sondern or Sundern was a type of land segregation in the Middle Ages in Germany, especially in North Rhine-Westphalia. It gave personal entitlement to farm specific areas of land without owning the land. A Königssondern (royal sondern) is land whose use was administered by the King. The term is still found in many place names, indicating the history of the locality.

References

History of North Rhine-Westphalia
Agriculture in Germany